The 2013 LSU Tigers football team represented Louisiana State University in the 2013 NCAA Division I FBS football season. They were led by ninth-year head coach Les Miles and played their home games at Tiger Stadium. They were a member of the Western Division of the Southeastern Conference.

Previous season and offseason
LSU entered the 2012 season as the defending SEC champion.  The Tigers accumulated a conference record of 6–2, with losses on the road against the Florida Gators and at home to the eventual national champions, the Alabama Crimson Tide.  After finishing the regular season with an overall record of 10–2, LSU was selected to play in the 2012 Chick-fil-A Bowl against the Clemson Tigers.  LSU was defeated by Clemson on a last second field goal by a score of 25–24.

Following the end of the season, LSU lost numerous players to the NFL Draft, including ten underclassmen, the most of any other team.  Key losses included second-team All Americans Kevin Minter and Eric Reid, third-team All American Sam Montgomery, and second-team All-SEC players Barkevious Mingo and Drew Alleman.

In February 2013, LSU announced that it had hired former Baltimore Ravens offensive coordinator, Cam Cameron, for the same position.  Cameron served as the Ravens' offensive coordinator for five seasons.  Cameron served for a single season as the head coach of the Miami Dolphins prior to joining the Ravens' staff.  Prior to that, Cameron was the offensive coordinator for five seasons for the San Diego Chargers.  Cameron had also previously spent time as part of the staff for the Michigan Wolverines alongside LSU head coach Les Miles for seven seasons from 1987 to 1993.  Cameron will be replacing Greg Studrawa as LSU's offensive coordinator.  Studrawa had spent the prior two seasons as offensive coordinator and offensive line coach.  Studrawa was retained as the offensive line coach.

Key departures

Class of 2013 signees

Coaching staff

Depth chart
The official opening day depth chart was released on August 22, 2014.'''

Schedule
LSU's 2013 schedule was released by the Southeastern Conference and LSU on October 18, 2012.

Rankings

Game summaries

TCU

UAB

Kent State

Auburn

Georgia

Mississippi State

Florida

Ole Miss

Furman

Alabama

Texas A&M

Arkansas

Iowa

References

LSU
LSU Tigers football seasons
ReliaQuest Bowl champion seasons
LSU Tigers football